WBCF-LD, virtual channel 3 (UHF digital channel 39), was a low-powered Launch TV-affiliated television station licensed to Florence, Alabama, United States. Owned by Benny Carle Broadcasting, the station mainly served the western portion of the Huntsville/Decatur media market, including the Muscle Shoals area.

The station's license was cancelled by the Federal Communications Commission on October 16, 2019.

References

External links

BCF-LD
Low-power television stations in the United States
Television channels and stations established in 2011
2011 establishments in Alabama
Television channels and stations disestablished in 2019
2019 disestablishments in Alabama
Defunct television stations in the United States
BCF-LD